Edward Joseph Friel was born in Belfast, Northern Ireland in 1962. He is a B. Mus. Honours graduate who in 1986 started his professional career as a music teacher.  After  one year he decided to pursue his talents as a musician and composer in local piano bars at home as well as in Canada and Europe, where he travelled for a year. He has toured with Van Morrison as a piano player and features extensively on Van Morrison's album Hymns to the Silence.

In 1995 he represented Ireland in the Eurovision Song Contest with the song "Dreamin'". The song finished a disappointing 14th place; Norway won the contest, breaking the three  years Ireland staged the contest.

References

Living people
Irish pop singers
Eurovision Song Contest entrants for Ireland
Eurovision Song Contest entrants of 1995
Irish music educators
1962 births